Wackenhut is a German language surname. Notable people with the name include:
 George Wackenhut (1919–2004), American private detective and investigator
 Mario Hamuy Wackenhut (born 1960), Chilean astronomer

References 

German-language surnames